Puppet Motel is a 1995 CD-ROM developed by The Voyager Company and released exclusively for the Apple Macintosh. Written and featuring by American singer-performance artist Laurie Anderson and designed by Hsin-Chien Huang, the CD-ROM is a mixture of video, audio and interactive digital artwork. The title comes from a song on Anderson's then-recent album, 1994's Bright Red. The song is among numerous Anderson compositions performed on the soundtrack, which features the first release of the song "Down in Soho". Anderson appears in digitized video form, both as herself and (using a vocal modulator to lower the pitch), as the voice of a ventriloquist's dummy. The CD-ROM contains many Easter eggs: hotspots that trigger video or audio segments. For example, clicking in the correct spot will trigger a video of the dummy performing the song "Puppet Motel".

Among features/activities on the CD-ROM (as promoted on the app's packaging):

 Leave messages on an answering machine.
 Play a celestial version of connect the dots to create one's own constellation.
 Play a digital version of an electronic violin.
 View Anderson discussing set design and other aspects of her recent "Nerve Bible" tour.
 More than an hour of music.

It was a non-mass-market CD-ROM, and along with Who Built America? had only middling financial success and could not prevent the company from a round of lay offs.

As of 2022, Puppet Model has yet to be reissued or made available online. The original CD-ROM runs on an early version of the MacOS that is no longer supported by modern Apple devices (which also lack CD-ROM drives), making the work difficult to access, though video excerpts have been posted to YouTube.

Critical reception
The Obscuritory felt the title gave the player an experience "all at once dark, confusing, desolate, and beautiful." CDM acknowledged that the work was self-aware as "media recognizing the demise of the CD". Digital Culture felt the title went beyond a game to become a "freestanding work of art".

References

External links
 Laurie Anderson Interview 1995 CD-ROM Interactive
 Electronic Entertainment interview

1995 video games
Adventure games
Art games
Classic Mac OS games
Fictional hotels
Fictional puppets
Video games based on musicians
Video games about toys
Video games developed in the United States
Windows games
Works by Laurie Anderson